Dr. Mohamed Dadkhah (1910–1980) was a world-renowned philatelist of Iran.

Collecting interests
Dadkhah specialized in the collection of postage stamps of Iran and Bushire.  He is known for his extensive collections, and his Iran presentation at the philatelic exhibition Philympia 1970 in London won him the gold award.

Philatelic literature
Dadkhah, in 1960, wrote the book Emissions du Type “Lion” de l'Iran 1865-1879 (also entitled The Lion Stamps of Persia in English) and received the Crawford Medal for his effort.

Philatelic activity
Dadkhah was active in the Iranian Philatelic Society which he founded, and remained president of, for the remainder of his life.

Honors and awards
Dadkhah was awarded the Crawford Medal in 1961, and he signed the Roll of Distinguished Philatelists in 1965. In 1983, he was named to the American Philatelic Society Hall of Fame.

See also
 Philatelic literature

References
 Dr. Mohamed Dadkhah

1910 births
1980 deaths
Philatelic literature
Iranian philatelists
American Philatelic Society